The 62nd Infantry Regiment "Sicilia" is an active unit of the Italian Army based in Catania in Sicily. The regiment is part of the Italian army's infantry corps and operationally assigned to the Mechanized Brigade "Aosta".

World War I 
During the First World War the regiment fought earning the cross of the Military Order of Italy to the infantry weapon. The regiment fought at Cima Palone, Monte Mascia, Monte Vies, Passo Buole, Monte Sperone, Malga Zugna, and Vallarsa.

In the first half of December 1915 some departments of the 62nd managed to take possession of Cima Vies and Cima la Cingla, after Cima Palone had also been conquered in October.

At the end of April 1916 the "Sicily" Brigade was transferred to Vallagarina, east of Lake Garda. On 18 May the Austrians launched the Strafexpedition, the "punitive expedition" and to face the invaders the 62nd was deployed in Serravalle, not far from Brentonico, while some companies belonging to both the 61st and 62nd regiments were sent to Passo Buole, where on May 30, during the battle of the Highlands led by the German and Austro-Hungarian forces , with a lightning bayonet counterattack, the overwhelming and fierce enemy infantry were rejected, managing to maintain a decisive position, deserving the flag of the 62nd the second bronze medal for military valor.

At the end of July the "Sicily" Brigade was assigned to the Macedonian front and translated to Taranto, in the first half of August the departments were shipped to Thessaloniki, from where the men reached the city of Sarigol, in Ellesponto, an area described as "Desert and malarial" in the summary made by the Historical Office.

From August 1916 to July 1919, the regiment was employed in the Macedonian sector of the Balkan front fighting at the bend of the Cerna in Vlakor on Mount Baba and on Mount Cerna in Kruscevo.

Current structure 
As of 2019 the 62nd Infantry Regiment "Sicilia" consists of:

  Regimental Command, in Catania
 Command and Logistic Support Company
 1st Infantry Battalion
 1st Fusiliers Company "Sollum"
 2nd Fusiliers Company "Tobruk"
 3rd Fusiliers Company "El Alamein"
 Maneuver Support Company

The Command and Logistic Support Company fields the following platoons: C3 Platoon, Transport and Materiel Platoon, Medical Platoon, and Commissariat Platoon. The regiment is equipped with Freccia wheeled infantry fighting vehicles. The Maneuver Support Company is equipped with Freccia mortar carries with 120mm mortars and Freccia IFVs with Spike LR anti-tank guided missiles.

See also 
 Mechanized Brigade "Aosta"

External links
Italian Army Website: 62° Reggimento Fanteria "Sicilia"

References

Infantry Regiments of Italy